Sugar was an American alternative rock band active in the early 1990s. Formed in 1992, they were led by the singer and guitarist Bob Mould (ex-Hüsker Dü), alongside bassist David Barbe (ex-Mercyland) and drummer Malcolm Travis (ex-Human Sexual Response).

Career
After frontman Bob Mould departed from Hüsker Dü, he released two solo ventures, Workbook and Black Sheets of Rain; neither album was well received and Mould was released from his contract with Virgin Records America in 1991 as a result. Shortly after, Mould recorded a demo tape of over thirty songs and formed Sugar with David Barbe and Malcolm Travis.
The band was named in an Athens, GA Waffle House Restaurant when Mould spotted a sugar packet on the table where he and the other two band members were sitting. 
Their first concert was on February 20, 1992, at the 40 Watt Club in Athens, Georgia, after a few weeks warming up in R.E.M.'s downtown practice space.

Later in 1992, the band released the album Copper Blue on Rykodisc in the US and Creation Records in the UK. Copper Blue was named Album Of The Year 1992 by NME. The music videos for the singles "If I Can't Change Your Mind" and "Helpless" received extensive air time on MTV shortly after the album's release. The single for "If I Can't Change Your Mind" had moderate success in the UK Singles Chart.

In the spring of 1993, they released Beaster, an EP of material recorded during the Copper Blue sessions. The album proved to be more aggressive than the content on Copper Blue. After an abortive attempt to record a second album, the band regrouped and released File Under: Easy Listening in September 1994. It reached No. 7 in the UK Albums Chart.

A b-side compilation album, Besides, followed in July 1995. The band played their final show in Japan in 1995, Mould broke the band up in spring 1996. Barbe wished to spend more time with his growing family and expand his solo career. Travis took over the drumming slot in Kustomized.

Bob Mould spent the summer of 2012 touring and playing Copper Blue in its entirety.

Discography

The discography of Sugar consists of three studio albums, one compilation album, one live album, two boxsets and eight singles.

Albums

Box sets
A Box of Sugar (Edsel, 2013) – 5xLP
Complete Recordings 1992-1995 (Edsel, 2014) – 5xCD

Singles
All singles were released on both Creation and Rykodisc; except where indicated.

References

External links
[ Sugar's AMG entry]

Creation Records artists
Alternative rock groups from Minnesota
Musical groups established in 1992
Musical groups disestablished in 1995
American musical trios
Rykodisc artists
Merge Records artists
1992 establishments in Texas